The Rio Times is an English-language newspaper and news and features website based in Rio de Janeiro, Brazil and one of the biggest newspapers in English in all of Latin America, with a reach twice as large as the second-placed Mexiconewsdaily.

Mission and Coverage
The Rio Times is an English language publication dedicated to anyone interested in Brazil and Latin America. The paper's editor is Swiss-born Matthias Camenzind, who bought The Rio times in March 2019 from its American founder Stone Korshak. Beyond national and local events, The Rio Times also covers issues of specific interest to foreign nationals in Brazil. The paper’s mission is to provide its readers with a broad spectrum of information and improve their understanding of Rio de Janeiro, São Paulo, Brazil, and Latin America.

In 2019 The Rio Times started to invest significantly more in reporting from all over Latin America. A third of all daily contributions today report on Latin America while two thirds deal with Brazil.

Online Newspaper

The Rio Times produced its first printed version, which increased from 5,000 to 10,000 in December 2011. It is distributed to a range of hotels and places popular with the Anglophone expat community.                        

The print version was abandoned in 2017. Since then The Rio Times has been published exclusively online.

External links

 
 The Rio Times's page on Twitter
 The Rio Times's Facebook page

Newspapers published in Brazil
English-language newspapers published in South America
Publications established in 2009
Mass media in Rio de Janeiro (city)
2009 establishments in Brazil